Shawsville Historic District is a national historic district located at Shawsville, Montgomery County, Virginia.  The district encompasses 13 contributing buildings in the central business district of Shawsville.  It consists principally of a group of late-19th and early-20th century frame and brick commercial buildings with dwellings located at the outer boundaries. Notable buildings include the Bank of Shawsville (1910), W.W. Lykens Furniture Store (c. 1905), White Memorial Church (c. 1935), and the Showalter House.

It was listed on the National Register of Historic Places in 1991.

References

Historic districts in Montgomery County, Virginia
Colonial Revival architecture in Virginia
National Register of Historic Places in Montgomery County, Virginia
Historic districts on the National Register of Historic Places in Virginia